New Morinda Junction (station code: NMDA) is located in Rupnagar district in the Indian state of Punjab and serves primarily as a junction point to switch trains for passengers. It is located about 2 km from Morinda town center on the outskirts of town. The town is served by older Morinda Junction railway station. New Morinda station falls under Ambala railway division under Northern Railway zone of Indian Railways. Morinda town is the administrative headquarter of Morinda Tehsil in Rupnagar district.

Overview 
This station is located on the single track,  broad gauge, Sirhind–Daulatpur Chowk line and Chandigarh–Sahnewal–Ludhiana line. This station was established as junction point when Chandigarh–Sahnewal line was envisaged to provide direct railway connectivity from capital city Chandigarh to Punjab.

Electrification 
New Morinda railway station has three electrified tracks and both lines of this junction are single-track electrified lines.

Amenities 
New Morinda railway station has 2 booking windows and no enquiry office. Station is classified under the lowest NSG6 category and has only basic amenities like drinking water, public toilets, sheltered area with adequate seating. Wheelchair availability is also there for disabled persons. There are two platforms at the station and one foot overbridge (FOB).

References

External links 

 Pictures of New Morinda Junction railway station

Railway stations in Rupnagar district
Ambala railway division